HMS Falmouth was a Rothesay-class, or "Improved Type 12", anti-submarine frigate built for the Royal Navy during the 1950s. She took part in the Third Cod War in 1976, ramming the Icelandic gunboat V/s Týr. Both ships suffered extensive damage.

Description
Steam for the turbines was provided by a pair of Babcock & Wilcox boilers. The ship's complement was 200–35 officers and ratings.

The ship mounted a pair of 4.5-inch (114 mm) Mk 6 guns in a single twin-gun turret forward. Her secondary armament consisted of a twin-gun STAAG mount for the Bofors  anti-aircraft gun aft. Falmouth mounted two triple-barrelled mounts for the Limbo anti-submarine mortar. The ship carried eight fixed torpedo tubes and two twin-tube rotating mounts for  torpedoes. The Rothesay-class ships were equipped with a Type 170 sonar for the Limbo as well as a general-purpose Type 174 sonar. They were fitted with a Type 293Q target-indication radar and a Type 277Q surface-search radar.

Construction and career
Falmouth was laid down on 23 November 1957 by Swan Hunter & Wigham Richardson, launched on 15 December 1959 and was completed on 25 July 1961.

In August 1961 Falmouth joined the 20th Frigate Squadron based at Londonderry Port, Northern Ireland. On 5 December that year, Falmouth collided with the oiler  in Lyme Bay and was badly damaged. From December 1963, Falmouth served as leader of the 30th Frigate Squadron. The 30th Flotilla, including Falmouth, served as part of the Far East Fleet from September 1964 to December 1964, and again from June 1965 until December that year.

From August 1968 to 6 January 1971, Falmouth was refitted at Portsmouth Dockyard, being fitted with a hangar and flight deck to allow operation of a single Westland Wasp helicopter, while a Seacat launcher was fitted on top of the hangar. One of the Limbo mortars and the Bofors guns were removed in compensation.

On the evening of 6 May 1976, after the outcome of the Third Cod War had already been decided, the Icelandic gunboat V/s Týr was trying to cut the nets of the fishing trawler Carlisle, when Captain Gerald Plumer of Falmouth ordered it rammed. Falmouth rammed the Týr at the speed of 22+ knots (41+ km/h), almost capsizing her. Týr did not sink and managed to cut the nets of Carlisle, after which the Falmouth rammed it again. The Týr was heavily damaged and found herself propelled by only a single screw and pursued by the tug-boat Statesman. As a response Captain Guðmundur Kjærnested gave orders to man Týrs guns to deter any further ramming. Falmouth also sustained serious structural damage on her bow during the incident, and had to enter dry dock at Portsmouth for repairs.

Falmouth left active service in 1980, when she was transferred to the Standby Squadron at Chatham, and by early 1982 she was being considered for disposal as a result of the 1981 Defence White Paper, which proposed cuts in the Royal Navy's surface fleet. Argentina's invasion of the Falkland Islands in April 1982 changed these plans, and Falmouth was given a refit and returned to active duty, although she did not take part in the Falklands War. Falmouth carried out a patrol in the South Atlantic from May 1983, returning to Britain in September that year. In March 1984, she was deployed to the Middle and Far East, returning home in August that year.

Notes

Publications

External links
 MaritimeQuest HMS Falmouth pages

 

Rothesay-class frigates
1959 ships
Ships of the Fishery Protection Squadron of the United Kingdom